This article lists the indigenous languages of South America. Extinct languages are marked by dagger signs (†).

Demographics by country
Demographics of indigenous languages of South America by country as of 2012, as reported by Crevels (2012):

Languages by classification

Jolkesky (2016)

Jolkesky (2016) lists 43 language families and 66 language isolates (and/or unclassified languages) in South America – a total of 109 independent families and isolates.

Andoke-Urekena
Andoke
Urekena

Arawa
Suruwaha
Madi-Deni-Paumari
Deni-Kulina: Deni; Kulina
Madi-Arawa
Arawa †
Madi: Banawa; Jamamadi; Jarawara
Paumari

Barbakoa
Barbakoa, Southern
Karanki †
Kayapa
Kijo †
Tsafiki
Barbakoa, Northern
Kokonuko
Kokonuko †
Guambiano-Totoro: Guambiano; Totoro
Pasto
Awa Pit
Barbakoa †
Pasto †
Sindagua †

Bora-Muinane
Bora; Miraña
Muinane

Chacha-Cholon-Hibito
Chacha †
Cholon
Hibito †

Chapakura-Wañam
Napeka
Rokorona
Chapakura-Kitemoka
Chapakura †
Kitemoka
More-Tora
More-Kuyubi
Kuyubi-Kumana: Kumana; Kuyubi
More
Tora
Kabixi
Urupa-Wañam-Wari
Urupa
Urupa
Yaru
Wañam-Wari
Wañam
Wari-Win: Oro Eo; Oro Wari; Oro Win

Charrua
Chana
Guenoa †
Minuan †

Chibcha
Pech
Votic
Maleku
Rama
Wetar
Isthmus
Boruka-Talamanca
Boruka
Talamanca
Teribe
Bribri-Kabekar
Bribri
Kabekar
Doraske-Changena
Changena †
Doraske
Guaymi
Buglere
Ngäbe
Kuna
Kuna Paya-Pukuro
Kuna San Blas
Magdalena
Barí
Chimila
Nutabe †
Tunebo
Muiska
Guane †
Muiska †
Sierra de Santa Marta
Kaggaba
Wiwa-Ika
Ika
Kankuamo †
Wiwa
Tairona †

Choko
Waunana
Embera
Embera, Southern: Embera Baudo; Embera Chami; Epena
Embera, Northern: Embera Katio; Embera Darien

Chon
Chon, Southern
Haush †
Selk'nam
Chon, Northern
Tewelche
Teushen †

Duho
Tikuna-Yuri
Karabayo
Tikuna
Yuri †
Saliba-Hodi
Hodi
Saliba-Betoi
Betoi †
Saliba-Piaroa
Saliba
Piaroa-Mako
Ature †
Mako
Piaroa

Guahibo
Guahibo, Nuclear
Kuiba
Sikuani
Playero
Guayabero
Hitnü

Harakmbet-Katukina
Amarakaeri; Arasaeri; Sapiteri; Wachipaeri
Katukina-Katawixi
Katawixi
Kanamari; Katukina

Jaqi
Aymara
Jaqaru
Jaqaru
Kawki

Jirajara †
Ayoman †
Gayon †
Jirajara †

Jivaro
Aguaruna
Palta †
Jivaro, Nuclear
Achuar-Shiwiar
Wambisa
Shuar

Karib
Karib, Western †
Karare †
Opon †
Karib, Central
Apalai
Hianakoto
Guake †
Hianakoto-Umawa †
Karihona
Kariña
Palmella †
Tarano
Akurio
Tiriyo
Wayana
Karib, Southern
Kuikuro
Kalapalo
Kuikuro
Matipu
Nahukwa
Pekodi
Arara-Ikpeng
Arara
Ikpeng
Bakairi
Pimenteira †
Karib, Northern
Parukoto
Kashuyana
Parukoto, Nuclear
Hishkaryana
Sikiana
Waiwai
Purukoto
Kapong: Akawayo; Patamona
Makushi
Pemon: Arekuna; Ingariko; Kamarakoto; Taurepang
Purukoto
Venezuela
De'kwana-Wayumara
De'kwana
Wayumara
Eñepa
Kumana
Chayma
Kumanagoto †
Mapoyo-Yabarana
Mapoyo
Pemono
Yabarana
Tamanaku †
Yao †
Tiverikoto †
Yao †
Yawaperi-Paravilhana
Sapara-Paravilhana
Paravilhana
Sapara
Yawaperi
Bonari †
Waimiri-Atroari
Yukpa-Japreria
Japreria
Yukpa

Kawapana
Shawi
Shiwilu

Kechua
Kechua I
Kechua Pacaraos
Kechua I, Central
Wallaga
Kechua Ambo-Pasco
Kechua Cajatambo
Kechua Wallaga
Kechua Wamalies
Kechua Junin
Kechua Tusi Pasco
Wankay
Kechua Waylla Wanka
Kechua Jauja-Wanka
Waylay
Kechua Conchucos, Southern
Kechua Conchucos, Northern
Kechua Corongo
Kechua Waylas
Kechua Siwas
Yauyos
Kechua Yauyos
Kechua II
Kechua Chincha †
Kechua Cusco, Classical †
Kechua IIa
Kechua Cajamarca-Lambayeque
Kechua Cajamarca
Kechua Lambayeque
Kechua Laraos-Lincha
Kechua Laraos
Kechua Lincha
Kechua IIb
Kechua Chachapoyas
Kechua San Martin
Kichua, Equatorial
Inga
Kichua Chimborazo
Kichua Imbabura
Kichua Kañar-Loja
Kichua Napo
Kichua Pastaza
Kichua Pichincha
Kichua Salasaca
Kichua Tena
Kechua IIc
Kechua Ayacucho
Kechua Cusco-Boliviano
Kechua Apolo
Kechua Arequipa
Kechua Boliviano
Kechua Cusco, Modern
Kechua Puno
Kechua Santiagueño

Lengua-Maskoy
Lengua: Enlhet; Enxet
Maskoy
Maskoy, Southern: Angaite; Sanapana
Maskoy, Northern: Kaskiha; Maskoy

Macro-Arawak
Kandoshi / Shapra
Muniche
Pukina †
Arawak
Yanesha
Arawak, Western
Aguachile †
Chamikuro
Mamoré-Paraguai
Mamoré-Guaporé
Mojo-Paunaka
Mojo: Ignaciano; Trinitario
Paunaka
Baure-Paikoneka
Baure: Baure; Joaquiniano; Muxojeone †
Paikoneka †
Terena: Chane †; Guana †; Kinikinau; Terena
Negro-Putumayo
Jumana-Pase: Jumana †; Pase †
Kaishana †
Nawiki
Kabiyari
Karu-Tariana
Karu: Baniwa; Kuripako
Tariana
Mepuri †
Piapoko-Achagua: Achagua; Piapoko
Wainambu †
Warekena-Mandawaka: Warekena; Mandawaka †
Yukuna-Wainuma: Mariate †; Wainuma †; Yukuna
Resigaro
Wirina †
Orinoco
Yavitero-Baniva: Baniva; Yavitero †
Maipure †
Pre-Andine
Ashaninka-Nomatsigenga: Ashaninka
Ashaninka-Kakinte: Ashaninka
Ashaninka-Asheninka
Ashaninka
Asheninka: Asheninka Pajonal; Asheninka Perene; Asheninka Pichis; Asheninka Ucayali; Ashininka
Kakinte
Machiguenga-Nanti: Machiguenga; Nanti
Nomatsigenga
Purus
Apurinã
Iñapari
Piro-Manchineri: Kanamare †; Kuniba †; Manchineri; Mashko Piro; Yine
Arawak, Eastern
Lower Amazon
Atlantic: Marawan †; Palikur
Guaporé-Tapajós
Saraveka †
Tapajós: Enawene-Nawe; Paresi
Xingu
Kustenau †
Waura-Mehinako: Mehinaku; Waura
Yawalapiti
Waraiku †
Solimões-Caribbean: Marawan †; Palikur
Marawa †
Caribbean
Kaketio †
Wayuu-Añun
Añun
Wayuu
Lokono-Iñeri
Iñeri: Garifuna; Kalhiphona †
Lokono
Shebayo †
Taino †
Negro-Branco
Arua †
Mainatari †
Negro
Bare-Guinao: Bare; Guinao †
Bawana-Kariai-Manao: Bawana †; Kariai †; Manao †
Yabaana †
Branco
Mawayana
Wapishana-Parawana: Aroaki †; Atorada; Parawana †; Wapishana

Macro-Mataguayo-Guaykuru
Payagua †
Guachi †
Guaykuru
Kadiweu
Qom-Abipon
Abipon †
Qom
Qom, Southern: Mokovi
Qom, Northern: Pilaga; Toba
Mataguayo
Mataguayo, Western
Chorote: Chorote Iyojwa'ja; Chorote Iyo'wujwa
Wichi: Wichi Guisnay; Wichi Nokten; Wichi Vejoz
Mataguayo, Eastern
Maka
Nivakle

Macro-Jê
Borum
Ofaye
Rikbaktsa
Yate
Bororo
Bororo
Otuke †
Umutina †
Maxakali
Malali †
Maxakali-Pataxo
Maxakali
Pataxo †
Kamakã †
Masakara †
Kamakã-Menien †
Kamakã †
Menien †
Kariri †
Dzubukua †
Kipea †
Xoko †
Macro-Jê, Nuclear
Besiro
Jeoromitxi-Arikapu: Arikapu; Jeoromitxi
Karaja: Javae; Karaja; Xambioa
Jê
Jê, Central
Akroa †
Xakriaba †
Xavante
Xerente
Jeiko †
Jê, Southern
Ingain: Ingain †; Kimda †
Kaingang-Xokleng
Kaingang: Kaingang; Kaingang Paulista
Xokleng
Jê, Northern
Apinaje
Kayapo: Mẽbengokre; Xikrin
Panara
Suya-Tapayuna: Suya; Tapayuna
Timbira: Apãniekra; Kraho; Krẽje †; Krĩkati; Parkateje; Pykobje; Ramkokamekra

Mapudungun
Mapudungun, Nuclear
Mapudungun
Pewenche
Rankelche
Mapudungun, Southern: Williche
Mapudungun, Northern
Pikunche †
Chango †

Moseten-Tsimane
Moseten
Tsimane

Mura-Matanawi
Matanawi †
Mura-Pirahã
Mura: Bohura †; Mura †
Pirahã

Nambikwara
Sabane
Nambikwara, Northern
Guaporé: Mamainde; Negarote; Tawende
Roosevelt: Lakonde; Latunde; Tawande
Nambikwara, Southern
Alantesu: Alantesu; Hahãintesu; Waikisu; Wasusu
Halotesu: Halotesu; Kithãulhu; Wakalitesu; Sawentesu
Manduka: Hukuntesu; Niyahlosu; Siwaisu
Sarare

Otomako-Taparita †
Otomako †
Taparita †

Pano-Takana
Takana
Ese Ejja
Kavineña-Takana
Kavineña
Takana
Araona
Maropa
Takana
Pano
Pano, Northern
Kulina (Pano)
Korubo
Matis
Matses
Pisabo
Pano, Nuclear
Kasharari
Pano, Western
Kashibo-Kakataibo: Kashibo; Kakataibo
Nokaman †
Pano, Central
Purus
Amawaka
Kashinawa
Yaminawa-Iskonawa-Marinawa: Iskonawa; Marinawa; Yaminawa; Yawanawa
Jurua
Kanamari (Pano)
Katukina (Pano)
Marubo
Nukini-Remo
Nukini
Remo
Poyanawa
Atsawaka †
Arazaeri †
Atsawaka †
Yamiaka †
Chakobo
Chakobo
Karipuna (Pano)
Pakawara
Shipibo-Kapanawa
Kapanawa
Shipibo-Wariapano: Sensi †; Wariapano; Shipibo

Peba-Yagua
Peba †
Peba †
Yameo †
Yagua

Puinave-Nadahup
Nadahup
Nadëb: Nadëb do Rio Negro; Nadëb do Roçado
Hup-Dâw
Dâw
Hup
Hupda
Yuhup
Puinave-Kak
Puinave
Kak
Kakwa
Nukak

Puri †
Coroado †
Puri †

Tallan †
Katakaos †
Kolan †

Timote-Kuika
Kuika †
Mukuchi †
Timote †

Tinigua-Pamigua
Pamigua †
Tinigua

Tukano
Tukano, Western
Kueretu †
Tukano, Western, Nuclear
Mai Huna
Koreguaje-Pioje
Koreguaje-Tama
Koreguaje
Tama †
Pioje
Makaguaje †
Sekoya
Siona
Tetete †
Tukano, Eastern
Tanimuka-Retuarã-Yahuna: Tanimuka; Retuarã; Yahuna
Tukano, Eastern, West
Kubeo-Desano
Kubeo
Desano-Yupua
Desano-Siriano: Desano; Siriano
Yupua †
Makuna-Barasano-Eduria: Makuna; Barasano; Eduria
Tukano, Eastern, East
Tukano-Tatuyo
Tukano
Tatuyo-Bara-Waimaha
Tatuyo
Bara-Waimaha: Bara; Waimaha
Tuyuka-Wanano
Wanano-Piratapuyu
Wanano
Piratapuyo
Tuyuka-Karapanã
Karapanã-Pisamira: Karapanã; Pisamira
Tuyuka-Yuruti: Tuyuka; Yuruti

Tupi
Arikem
Arikem †
Karitiana
Monde
Paiter
Monde, Nuclear
Monde
Cinta-Larga-Zoro
Arua
Cinta-Larga
Gavião-Zoro: Gavião; Zoro
Ramarama-Purubora
Purubora
Ramarama: Karo; Urumi
Tupari
Makurap
Tupari, Nuclear
Sakurabiat-Akuntsu
Akuntsu
Sakurabiat
Kepkiriwat †
Tupari
Wayoro
Tupi, Nuclear
Juruna
Juruna
Manitsawa †
Shipaya
Munduruku
Kuruaya
Munduruku
Mawe-Aweti-Tupi-Guarani
Satere-Mawe
Aweti-Tupi-Guarani
Aweti
Tupi-Guarani
Kamayura
Kaapor-Ava
Ava-Canoeiro
Kaapor: Anambe †; Aura; Guaja; Takuñape †; Urubu-Kaapor
Akwawa-Arawete
Akwawa-Tapirape
Akwawa: Asurini do Tocantins; Parakanã; Surui (Tupi-Guarani)
Tapirape
Arawete-Asurini
Arawete: Amanaye †; Anambe; Ararandewara †; Arawete
Asurini do Xingu
Tupi-Guarani, Nuclear
Tenetehara: Guajajara; Tembe; Turiwara †
Kawahib-Kayabi
Apiaka
Juma
Kayabi
Kawahib: Amondawa; Karipuna (Tupi); Parintintin; Piripkura; Tukumanfed †; Uruewauwau; Wirafed
Tupi-Guarani, Diasporic
Guarani-Guarayu-Siriono
Guarayu: Guarayu; Pauserna
Siriono: Siriono; Jora †; Yuki
Guarani
Ache
Guarani: Guarani, Classical †; Chiriguano; Chiripa
Central: Guarani Paraguaio
Western: Guarani Boliviano; Tapiete
Eastern: Kayowa; Mbya; Ñandeva; Pai Tavytera; Sheta
Tupinamba-Kokama
Kokama-Omagua: Kokama; Kokamilla; Omagua
Tupi: Tupi †; Tupi Austral †
Tupinamba: Nhengatu; Tupinamba †
Wayampi: Emerillon; Wayampi; Zo'e

Uru-Chipaya
Chipaya
Murato
Uru / Uchumataqu

Warpe †
Allentiak †
Millkayak †

Witoto-Okaina
Okaina: Okaina
Witoto
Witoto Nüpode
Minika-Murui
Witoto-Minika
Witoto-Murui
Nonuya

Yanomami
Sanuma
Yanam
Yanomami, Central
Yanomami-Yanomamï: Yanomam; Yanomamï
Yaroame

Zamuko
Ayoreo: Ayoreo; Zamuko †
Chamakoko
Tomaraho
Ïbïtoso

Zaparo
Zaparo, Western
Arabela
Zaparo
Zaparo, Eastern
Kawarano
Ikito

Isolates
Aikanã
Andaki †
Arara do Rio Branco
Arutani
Atakame †
Atikum †
Aushiri †
Chono †
Guamo †
Guato
Gününa Këna
Iranche/MykyItonamaKakan †KamsaKañari †KanichanaKanoeKawesqarKayuvavaKerandi †Kimbaya †Kingnam †KofanKomechingon †Koraveka †Kueva †Kulle †Kunza †Kuruminaka †KwazaLekoLule †Máku †Malibu †Mochika †Mokana †Morike †MovimaMuzo-Kolima †OmuranoOti †PaezPanche †Pijao †Puruha †Sanaviron †SapeSechura †Tarairiu †TarumaTaushiroTekirakaTrumaiTuxa †UmbraUrarinaVilelaWaoraniWaraoXukuru †YaganYaruroYurakareYurumangui †Zenu'' †

Campbell (2012)

Lyle Campbell (2012) proposed the following list of 53 uncontroversial indigenous language families and 55 isolates of South America – a total of 108 independent families and isolates.

Aikaná (Aikanã, Huarí, Warí, Masaká, Tubarão, Kasupá, Mundé, Corumbiara)
(dialect: Masaká (Massaca, Massaka, Masáca))

Andaquí †

Andoque (Andoke, Cho'oje, Patsiaehé)

Arawakan (Arahuacan, Maipurean, Maipuran)
Northern Arawakan (Upper Amazon, Maritime, and Eastern branches)
Upper Amazon branch
Western Nawiki sub-branch
Wainumá group
Wainumá † (Waima, Wainumi, Waiwana, Waipa, Yanuma)
Mariaté †
Anauyá †
Piapoco group
Achagua (Ajagua, Xagua)
Piapoco
Amarizana †
Cabiyarí (Caviyarí, Kaviyarí, Cabiuarí, Cauyarí, Cuyare)
Warekena group
Guarequena (Warekena, Guarenquena, Arequena)
Mandahuaca (Mandawaka, Mandauaca, Maldavaca, Ihini, Arihini, Maldavaca, Cunipusana, Yavita, Mitua)
Río Negro group †
Jumana †
Pasé †
Kawishana † (Cawishana, Kaiwishana, Kayuwishana)
Yucuna (Jukuna) (dialects or languages)
Yucuna (Chucuna, Matapí) (Jukuna)
Garú † (Guarú)
Eastern Nawiki sub-branch
Tariana (Tariano, Tarîna, Taliáseri)
Karu (dialects or languages)
Ipeka-Kurripako (dialects or language)
Karútana-Baniwa (Baniva) dialect group
Katapolítani-Moriwene-Mapanai (dialects or language)
Resígaro
Central Upper Amazon sub-branch
Baré group
Marawá †
Baré (Bare, Ihini, Barawana, Barauna, Barauana, Arihini, Maldavaca, Cunipusana, Yavita, Mitua), Guinao † (Guinaú) (Aikhenvald (1999a: 71) mentions Guinau with Bare.)
Yavitero group
Yavitero † (Yavitano)
Baniva †
Maipure † (Aikhenvald (1999a: 71) gives Yavitero and Baniwa of Yavita as alternative names for a single language.)
Manao group
Manao †
Kariaí †
Arawakan Upper-Amazon branch languages of uncertain grouping
Waraikú †
Yabaána † (Jabaana, Yabarana)
Wiriná †
Xiriâna † (Shiriana)
Maritime branch (Caribbean)
Aruán † (Aruá, Aroã)
Mawayana (Mahuayana, Mapidian)
Wapixana (Wapishana, Wapixiána, Wapisiana, Uapixana, Vapidiana) (dialects or languages) (dialects: Amariba, Atorai)
Ta-Maipurean sub-branch
Taíno †
Guajiro group
Guajiro (Goahiro, Goajiro, Guajira, Wayuunaiki, Wayuu)
Paraujano (Añún) (dialects: Alile, Toa)
Arawak (Locono, Lokono, Aruak, Arowak)
Iñeri (Igneri, Island Carib) (dialects or languages)
Kalhíphona † (Island Carib)
Garífuna (Black Carib)
Eastern branch
Palikur (Palikour, Palicur, Palijur) (dialects or languages)
Marawán-Karipurá †
Southern division
Western branch
Amuesha (Amuese, Amoesha, Amueixa, Amoishe, Amagues, Amage, Omage, Amajo, Lorenzo, Amuetamo, Amaje, Yanesha)
Chamicuro (Chamicura, Chamicolo)
Central branch
Paresí group
Paresí (Parecís, Paretí, Haliti)
Saraveca † (Sarave)
Waurá group
Waurá-Meinaku (Uara, Aura, Mahinacu)
Yawalapití (Jaulapiti, Yaulapiti)
Custenau † (Kustenau)
Southern Outlier branch
Terena (Tereno, Terêna, Etelena, Guaná, Chané, Kinikinao) (dialects: Kinikanao, Etelena (Terena), Guaná)
Mojo group
Mojo (Morocosi, Mojeño, Moxeño, Moxo) (dialects or languages)
Ignaciano
Trinitario (dialects: Loreto (Loretano), Javierano)
Bauré (Chiquimiti, Joaquiniano may be a dialect of Bauré)
Paunaca (Pauna-Paicone (Paiconeca))
Piro group
Piro (dialects: Chontaquiro, Maniteneri, Maxineri)
Iñapari (Inamarí) (dialects: Inapari/Inamarí, Cuchitineri (Kushitineri), Cuniba)
Kanamaré † (Canamaré)
Apuriná (Apurinã, Ipuriná, Kangite (Cangaiti), Popengare)
Campa branch (Campa dialects or languages)
Ashéninka (Ashéninga)
Asháninka (Asháninga)
Caquinte (Kakinte)
Pajonal Ashéninka (Pajonal Campa)
Machiguenga (Matsiguenga, Matsigenka) (dialects: Caquinte (Poyenisate), Nomatsiguenga (Atiri), Machiguenga)
Nomatsigenga
Nanti
Other Arawakan languages too scantily known to determine to which branch of the family they belong:
Cumeral (Ethnologue)
Shebaya † (Shebayo, Shebaye) (David Payne 1991: 366–367)
Lapachu (Apolista, Aguachile)
Morique † (Morike)
Ponares (Ethnologue)
Omejes (Ethnologue)
Salumã (Rodrigues 1986: 72)
Tomedes (Tamudes)

Arawan (Arauán, Arahuan, Arawa)
Paumarí (Purupurú, Pamarí, Palmarí, Curucuru) (dialects: Kurukuru, Uaiai, Paumarí (Pammari))
Madi (Jarawara (Jarauára, Jaruára), Jamamadi, Banawá (Banivá, Baniwá-Jafí, Kitiya, Banavá, Banauá, Jafí))
Zuruahá (Suruahá, Sorowahá)
Dení-Kulina
Dení (dialect: Inauini)
Culina (Kulína; Madihá, Madija, Corina)
Arawá † (Arua, Arauan)

Atacameño † (Cunza, Kunza, Atacama, Lipe Lican Antai)
(local varieties: Apatama, Casabindo, Churumata, Cochinoca)

Awaké (Ahuaqué, Oewacu, Arutani, Uruák)

Aymaran (Jaqi, Aru)
Southern Aymara
Central Aymara (Tupe branch) (dialects: Jaqaru and Cauqui (Kawki))

Baenan † (Baena, Baenã)

Barbacoan
Northern group
Awan (Awa)
Awa Pit (Cuaiquer, Coaiquer, Kwaiker, Awa)
Pasto-Muellama
Muellama † (Muellamués)
Pasto †
Coconucan (Guambiano-Totoró)
Guambiano (Mogües, Moguez, Moguex, Wam, Misak, Guambiano-Moguez, Namdrik)
Totoró (Totoro, Polindara)
Coconuco † (Kokonuko, Cauca, Wanaka)
Southern group
Cha'palaachi (Cayapa, Chachi, Nigua)
Tsafiki (Colorado, Colima, Campaz, Tsáchela, Tsachila, Tsafiqui)
Extinct Barbacoa; Cara (Kara, Caranqui, Karanki, Imbaya); Pasto (Muellamués (Muellama)), Sindagua (Malla), and Coconuco

Betoi † (Betoy, Jirarra, Jirarru)
(dialects: Airico, Betoi, Ele, Jirara, Lolaca, Situfa)

Boran (Bora-Muinane)
Bora (Boro, Meamuyna; Miriña/Miranha)
Muinane (Muinane Bora, Muinani, Muename)

Bororoan
Eastern Bororo (Bororo proper, Boe)
Western Bororo
Umutina † (Umotina, Barbado)
Otuque † (Otuké, Otuqui, Louxiru) (dialects: Coraveca (Corave, Curave, Ecorabe), Curuminaca, Curumina,  Curucaneca, Curucane, Tapii)

Cahuapanan (Jebero, Kawapanan, Kahuapanan; earlier called Maina, Mainan)
Cahuapana † (Cuncho, Chuncho, Concho, Chonzo)
Chayahuita (Chawi, Chayabita, Chayhuita, Balsopuertino, Paranapura, Cahuapa; Chayawita, Tshaahui, Tsaawí, Chayabita, Shayabit, Balsapuertino; Paranapura)
Jebero (Xebero, Chebero, Xihuila, Shiwilu)

Camsá (Sibundoy, Sebondoy, Coche, Kamsá, Kamemtxa, Kamse, Camëntsëá, Mocoa, Quillacinga)

Cañar-Puruhá †
Cañar † (Cañari)
Puruhá † (Puruguay)

Candoshi (Candoxi, Maina, Kandoshi, Shapra, Murato, Roamaina)
(dialects: Shapra (Chapara), Kandoshi)

Canichana † (Canesi, Kanichana, Canisiana)

Cariban
Venezuelan branch (Gildea 2003)
Pemóng-Panare macro-group
Pemóng group (Kapóng, (Akawaio, Patamuna, Ingarikó), Makushi, Pemón (Taurepang, Kamarakóto, Arekuna))
Panare
Mapoyo-Tamanaku macro-group
Mapoyo/Yawarana (Mapoyo, Wanai, Yawarana, Pémono)
Tamanaku †
Pekodian branch
Bakairí
Arara group: Arara (Parirí), Ikpéng (Txikão)
Subgroups not yet classified in possible larger subgroups in the family:
Kumaná † (Chaima †, Cumanagota †)
Makiritare (De'kwana, Ye'kwana, Maiongong)
Nahukwa group: Kuikúru, Kalapalo
Parukotoan group
Katxúyana (Kaxuiâna, Shikuyana, Warikyana)
Waiwai subgroup: Waiwai (Wabui, Tunayana), Hixkaryana
Taranoan group
Tiriyo subgroup: Akuriyo, Tiriyo, Trio
Karihona (Carijona)
Yukpa group: Yukpa, Japréria
Languages not yet classified within possible subgroups:
Apalaí
Kari'nja (Carib, Kalinya, Cariña, Galibi)
Waimirí Atroarí
Wayana

Cayuvava † (Cayuwaba, Cayubaba, Kayuvava)

Chapacuran (Chapakuran, Txapakuran)
Itene group (Central Chapacuran)
Wanham (Wañam, Wanyam, Huanyam)
Kumaná (Torá, Toraz, Cumana, Cautario) (Abitana-Kumaná)
Kabixí (Cabishi, Cabichí, Habishi, Parecís, Pawumwa)
Itene (Iteneo, Iténez, Moré)
Wari group (Southern Chapacuran)
Quitemo † (Quitemoca) (Kitemo-Nape)
Chapacura † (Huachi, Wachi, Tapacura, Chapakura)
Urupá-Jarú (Txapakura; Yaru, Jaru, Ituarupa)
Orowari (Pakaás-novos, Pacasnovas, Pacaha-novo, Uariwayo, Uomo, Jaru, Oro Wari)
Oro Win

Charrúan †
Charrúa †
Güenoa † (Minuane)
Chaná †

Chibchan
Paya (Pech)
Core Chibchan
Votic
Rama (Melchora, Voto, Boto, Arama, Arrama)
Guatuso (Malecu)
Isthmic
Western Isthmic
Viceitic
Cabécar (Chirripó, Tucurrique, Estrella)
Bribri (Viceíta)
Teribe (Térraba, Tiribí, Tirub)
Boruca † (Brunca)
Doracic
Dorasque † (Chumulu, Gualaca)
Chánguena † (Chánguina, Chánguene)
Eastern Isthmic
Guaymíic
Movere (Move, Guaymí, Penonomeño, Ngawbere/Ngäbere) (dialects: Inland Bocas del Toro, Coastal Bocas del Toro, Chiriquí)
Bocotá (Murire, Muoi, Guaymí Sabanero, Movere Sabanero)
Cuna (Cueva, Paya-Pocuro, Kuna)
Magdalenic
Southern Magdalenic
Chibcha
Muisca † (Mosca, Chibcha)
Duit †
Tunebo (Uwa, Uw Cuwa; Tame, Sínsiga, Tegría, Pedraza) (dialects: Cobaría, Tegría, Agua Blanca, Barro Negro)
Barí (Motilón, Dobocubí, Cunaguasaya)
Northern Magdalenic
Arhuacic
Cogui (Cágaba, Kogi, Kogui, Coghui, Kagaba)
Eastern-Southern Arhuacic
Eastern Arhuacic
Damana (Guamaca, Sanká, Sanhá, Arsario, Malayo, Marocasero, Wiwa)
Kankuama (Atanques)
Ica (Bíntucua, Ika, Arhuaco, Bintuk)
Chimila (Chamila, Caca Weranos, San Jorge, Shimizya)
Unclassified
Huetar †
Antioqueño † (two varieties: Nutabe and Catío (not to be confused with the Emberá (Chocoan) variety called Catío).

Chipaya-Uru (Uru-Chipaya, Uruquilla)
Chipaya (erroneously earlier also called "Puquina")
Uru (Uru of Iru-Itu, Uchumataqu, Iru-Wit'u, Uro)
Chholo † (Murato)

Chiquitano (Besïro, Chiquito, Tarapecosi)
(dialects: Besïro (Lomerío), Concepción, San Javier (Javierano), San Miguel, Santiago, Churapa, Sansimoniano, Tao)

Chocoan
Waunana (Noanamá, Huaunana, Woun Meu, Waun Meo, Waumeo, Wounmeu, Wounaan, Noanama, Noenama, Nonama, Chocama, Chanco)
Emberá dialect continuum (Catío, Chamí, Napipí River, Saija, Sambú)
Southern Emberá
Northern Emberá (Emperã, Eberã Bed'ea, Eperã Pedea, Atrato, Darién, Dariena, Panama Embera, Eberã, Cholo (Choco))

Cholonan † (Hibito-Cholon)
Cholón † (Seeptsá, Tinganeses, Cholona)
Híbito † (Hibito, Xibito, Xibita, Jibito, Chibito, Zibito, Ibito, Xibitoana)

Chonan (Tehuelchean, Chon family)
Chonan proper
Island Chonan
Ona † (Selknam, Selk'nam, Shelknam, Aona)
Haush † (Manekenken)
Continental Chonan
Tehuelche (Aoniken, Aonek'enk, Inaquen, Patagón)
Teushen † (Tehues, Patagón)
Patagón Costero †
Gününa-Küne † (Gennaken, Northern Tehuelche, Puelche, Pampa, Gününa Yajich)

Chono †

Cofán (Kofan, A'ingaé)

Culle † (Culli, Ilinga, Linga)

Esmeralda † (Esmeraldeño, Tacame)

Gamela † (Barbados, Curinsi, Acobu)

Guach' †

Guaicuruan (Waikuruan, Waykuruan)
Kadiwéu (Caduveo, Mbayá, Ediu-Adig)
Southern Guaicuruan
Pilagá (Pilaca)
Toba (Qom, Namqom)
Mocoví (Mocobí)
Abipón †

Guajiboan (Guahiboan)
Guajibo (Guahibo, Guaybo, Sikuani, Sicuani, Guajibo, Goahibo, Guaigua, Guayba, Wahibo, Goahiva, Hiwi) (dialects: Guahibo (Sikuani), Amorua (Rio Tomo Guahibo), Tigrero)
Cuiva (Cuiba, Cuiba-Wámonae) (dialects: Chiricoa, Masiware (Masiguare), Chiripo (Wupiwi, Siripu), Yarahuuraxi-Capanapara, Mayayero, Mochuelo-Casanare-Cuiba, Tampiwi (Mariposas), Amaruwa (Amorua), Mella, Ptamo, Sicuane (Sicuari))
Churuya †
Guayabero (Cunimía, Jiw, Mítus, Mítua)

Guamo †

Guató

Harákmbut-Katukinan
Harákmbut (Harakmbet, Hate, Tuyoneri, "Mashco")
(several dialects in two clusters: (1: Huachipaeri, Toyoeri (Tuyoneri, Tuyuneri); 2: Amaracaeri (Amarakaeri), Sapiteri, Arasaeri)
Katukinan (Catuquinan)
Katukina (Catuquina, Katukina do Jutaí) (dialect: Cutiadapa (Kutia-Dyapa))
Dyapá (Southern Katukinan, Tshom-Djapá (Txunhuã-Djapá), Canamarí, Kanamarí) (perhaps the same as Tucundiapa (Tucano Dyapa, Hondiapa/Hon-Dyapá))
Katawixí (Catawixi, Catauixi, Catawishi, Catauichi)

Huarpean † (Warpean)
Huarpe † (Allentiac)
Millcayac †

Irantxe (Iranxe, Iranche, Iranshe, Mynky, Münkü, Menki, Manoki, Myky)
(dialects: Münkü (Mynky, Menku, Menkü, Myy), Irántxe))

Itonama (Saramo, Machoto)

Jabutían (Yabutían)
Jabutí (Yabutí, Jabotí, Djeoromitxí, Kipiu, Quipiu)
Arikapú (Maxubí, Aricapú)

Jêan (Gêan, Jê family)
Northeastern Jê (Northern Jê)
Timbíra (Canela (Kanela)), Krenjé, Krahó, Pykobyê)
Kreen-Akarore (Ipewí, Kren-Akarore, Creen-Acarore, Panará)
Apinajé (Apinayé)
Kayapó (Cayapó, Kokairmoro) (dialects: Xikrin (Xukru, Diore), Kararaó, Kayapó-Kradaú)
Suyá (dialects: Beiço de Pau (Tapayuna), Yaruma (Jarumá, Waiku))
Central Jê (Akwe branch)
Xavánte (Shavante, Chavante, A'uwe, A'we, Uptabi, Akuên, Akwen, Crisca, Pusciti, Tapacua)
Akroá † (Akroá-Mirim, Acroá, Koroá, Coroá)
Xerénte (Sherenté, Xerenti)
Xakriabá † (Chicriaba, Chakriaba, Shacriaba, Chikriaba)
Southern Jê
Kaingang (Coroado, Coroados, Caingang, Bugre) (dialects: Paraná Kaingang, Central Kaingang, Southwest Kaingang, Southeast Kaingang)
Xokléng (Shocleng, Aweikoma, Bugre, Botocudos)
Ingáin † (Tains, Tain)
Wayaná † (Guayaná, Guayana, Gualachí, Guanhanan)

Jirajaran †
Jirajara †
Ayomán † (Ayamán)
Gayón † (Coyón)

Jivaroan
Shuar (Jívaro, Maina, Jíbaro)
Aguaruna (Aguajun, Ahuajun)
Achuar (Achual, Achuar-Shiwiar)
Huambisa

Jotí (Yoana, Yuana, Yuwana, Waruwaru (Waruwádu), Chicano, Chikano, Joti, Jodi, Hotí, Hodï)

Kaliana (Sapé, Calianá, Cariana, Chirichano)

Kamakanan †
Kamakán † (Camacán)
Kamakán † (Kamakã, Camacán, Ezeshio)
Mongoyó † (Mangaló, Monshoko)
Kotoxó † (Kutaxó, Catashó, Cotoxó, Catathóy)
Menién † (Manyã)
Masakará † (Masacará)

Kapixaná (Kanoê, Capixana)

Karajá (Caraja, Xambioá, Chamboa, Ynã, Karayá)
Karajá-Xambioá † (Chamboa, Ynã)
Javaé (Javaje, Javae)

Karirían † (Karirí family)
Kipeá † (Karirí, Kirirí)
Dzubukuá † (Kiriri, Dzubucua)
Sabuyá † (Sapoyá)
Kamurú † (Camurú, Pedra Branca)

Krenakan (Botocudoan, Aimoré language complex)
Krenak (Botocudo, Aimoré, Nakrehé, Nakpié, Naknyanúk, Etwet, Minyãyirún, Yiporók, Pojitxá, Potén, Krekmún, Bakuén, Aranã, Batachoa, Crenaque)
Guêren † (Guerén, Gren, Borun, Borúm)

Kwaza (Koayá, Koaiá, Quaiá, Arara)

Leco † (Lapalapa, Leko, Rik'a, Ateniano)

Lule-Vilelan †
Lule †
Vilela †

Máko † (Maco, Makú, Macu)

Makúan (Makú family, Makú-Puinavean, Puinavean, Vaupés-Japura, Nadahup family, Guaviaré-Japurá family)
Eastern Makúan
Nadëb branch
Roçando Nadëb
Rio Negro Nadëb
Dâw-Hupda-Yuhup
Dâw (Kamã, Kamã Makú, Kamarada, Makú-Kamarada)
Hupda-Yuhup
Hup (Hupda, Hupdë, Hupdá Makú, Macú de Tucano, Ubdé) (dialects: Hupdë, Tuhup, Nëhup)
Yuhup (Makú-Yahup, Yëhup, Yahup, Yahup Makú, "Maku")
Western Makúan
Kakua group
Kakua (Cacua, Bará, Macu de Cubeo, Macu de Guanano, Macu de Desano, Báda, Kákwa) (dialects: Vaupés Cacua, Macú-Paraná Cacua)
Nukak
Puinave (Wonsüht, Wãnsöhöt)

Mapudungun (Mapudungu, Araucano, Mapuche, Maputongo, Chiledugu, "Auca")

Mascoyan (Mascoian, Maskoyan, Lengua-Mascoy, Enlhet-Enenlhet)

Matacoan (Mataco-Mataguayan, Mataguayan)
Chorote (Chorotí, Manjuy) (dialects: Iyo'wujwa, Yohwaha, Manjuy)
Nivaclé (Niwaklé, Chulupí, Ashlushlay)
Maká (Macá, Enimaca, Enimaga)
Wichí (Mataco, Mataguayo, Weenhayek) (dialects: Nocten, Güisnay (Pilcomayo Wichí), Vejos (Vejoz, Aiyo, Hueshuo))

Matanauí † (Matanawí, Mitandua, Moutoniway)

Maxakalían
Maxakalí (Mashakali, Maxacari)
Kapoxó † (Capoxo, Caposho)
Monoxó † (Monoshó, Monachobm, Menacho)
Makoní † (Maconí)
Malalí †
Pataxó † (Pataxó-Hanhanhain, Patasho)

Mochica † (Yunga, Yunca, Chimú, Mochica, Muchic)

Mosetenan (Mosetén-Chimane)
Chimane (Chiman, Tsimane, Chumano, Nawazi-Moñtji)
Mosetén (Rache, Muchan, Tucupi, Aparono)

Movima (Mobima, Moyma, Movime)

Munichi † (Muniche, Munichino, Otanabe)

Muran
Mura †
Pirahã (Pirahá)
Bohurá † (Buxwaray)
Yahahí †

Nambikwaran (Nambicuaran, Nambiquaran, Nambikuaran)
Mamaindê (Northern Nambiquara, Mamande, Nakarothe) (dialects: Mamaindé, Negarotê, Tawanxte, Taxmainite, Taxwensite, Yalapmunxte (Lacondê, Latundê)
Southern Nambikuaran
Nambiquara (Nambikwara) (dialects: Manduka, Khithaulhu, Halotesu, Saxwentesu, Wakalitesu, Serra Azul, Hahaintesu, Wasusu, Alatesu, Waikisu, Galera)
Kithãulhú (Southern Nambiquara) (dialect complex: Kabishi, Nambiquara, etc.)
Sararé
Sabané (Sabanés)

Natú † (Peagaxinan)

Ofayé † (Opayé, Ofayé-Xavante, Opaié-Shavante, Ofaié)

Omurano † (Humurana, Numurana)

Otomacoan †
Otomaco †
Taparita †

Paezan
Paez (Nasa Yuwe, Paisa)
Paniquitá
(?) Panzaleo † (Latacunga, Quito)

Pankarurú † (Pancararu, Pancarurú, Brancararú, Pankarará, Pankarú, Pancaru, Pancaré, Pankaravu, Pankaroru)

Pano-Takanan
Panoan
Mayoruna branch
Mayo group
Matses
Korubo (Chankuëshbo as co-dialect)
Dëmushbo
Kulina
Matis
Mainline branch
Kasharari
Core Mainline branch
Kashibo (Kakataibo as co-dialect)
Nawa group
Chakobo; (Pakawara as co-dialect)
Marubo subgroup
Marubo
Katukina
Poyanawa subgroup
Poyanawa
Iskonawa
Nukini
Shipibo (with Konibo and Kapanawa as co-dialects)
Headwaters subgroup
Kashinawa
Amawaka
Yaminawa (dialects: Sharanawa, Yawanawa, Shanenawa (Katukina de Feijó), Shawanawa (Arara), Mastanawa, Marinawa)
Takanan
Takana group
Tacana (Tupamasa)
Reyesano (San Borjano, Maropa)
Araona (Carina, Cavina)
Cavineña
Chama group
Ese'ejja (Ese'eha, Ese Ejja, Ese Exa, Tiatinagua, Chama, Tambopata-Guarayo, Huarayo, Guacanawa, Chuncho, "Chama")
Toromona † (Toromono)

Payaguá †

Puquina † (Pukina)

Purían † (Puri-Coroado)
Purí † (Coroado)
Koropó † (Coropa)

Qawasqaran (Alacalufan)
Qawasqar (Northern Alacaluf, Alacaluf, Kaweskar, Kawésqar, Kawaskar, Aksánas) (dialects: Kawésqar, Tawókser)
Alacaluf (Central Alacaluf, Hekaine)
Southern Alacaluf (Halakwalup, Pecheré)

Quechuan
Central Quechua (Huaihuash (Waywash)/Quechua I)
Pacaraos Quechua
Central Quechua
"Waylay" (Huailay, North)
Huaylas Quechua (Ancash Quechua)
Conchucos Quechua
Ap-am-ah
Alto Pativilca
Alto Marañón
Alto Huallaga (Huánuco)
"Wankay" (Huancay, South)
Yaru Quechua (Tarma, Junín)
Jauja-Huanca Quechua (Jauja, Huaycha Huanca, Huaylla Huanca (Huancayo))
Huangascar-Topará Quechua
Peripheral Quechua (Huampuy/Quechua II)
"Yungay" (Quechua IIA)
Central
Laraos
Lincha
Apurí
Chocos
Madeán
Northern
Cañaris-Incahuasi Quechua
Cajamarca Quechua
"Chinchay" (Quechua IIB-C)
Northern
Chachapoyas Quechua (Amazonas Quechua)
San Martín Quechua
Loreto Quechua
Ecuador Quechua
Southern
Southern Peruvian Quechua
Ayacucho Quechua
Cuzco Quechua
Puno Quechua
Northern Bolivian Quechua
Southern Bolivian Quechua
Santiago del Estero Quichua ("Cusco")
Catamarca-La Rioja Quichua †

Rikbaktsá (Aripaktsá, Erikbatsa, Erikpatsa, Canoeiro)

Sabela (Huao, Wao, Auca, Huaorani, Huarani, Waorani, Auishiri)

Sáliban (Sálivan, Sáliba-Piaroan)
Sáliva (Sáliba)
Piaroa (Piaroa-Maco, Wothüha, Guagua, Quaqua)
Mako

Sechura-Catacaoan † (Sec)
Sechura †
Tallán † (Atalán)
(varieties: Colán and Catacaos)

Taruma (Taruamá)

Taushiro (Pinchi, Pinche)

Tequiraca (Tekiraka, Aushiri, Auishiri, Avishiri, Avixiri, Abiquira, Abishira, Abigira, Agouisiri, Ixignor, Vacacocha)

Tikuna-Yurí
Tikuna (Ticuna, Tukuna, Tucuna)
Yurí (Jurí, Yuri, Xurúpixuna)

Timotean † (Timote-Cuica)
Timote-Cuica † (Miguri, Cuica)
Mucuchí-Maripú † (Mocochí; Mirripú)

Tiniguan †
Tinigua (Timigua)
Pamigua (Pamiwa) †

Trumai (Trumaí, Tramalhy)

Tukanoan (Tucanoan)
Western Tukanoan
Coreguaje (Koreguaje, Caquetá, Correguaje, Ko'reuaju, Chaocha Pai)
Siona-Secoya
Macaguaje † (Makawahe, Piojé)
Secoya (Piohé, Siona-Secoya)
Siona
Teteté † (Eteteguaje) (possibly a dialect of Siona)
Orejón (Maijuna, Coto, Koto, Payoguaje, Payaguá, Payagua, Mai Ja, Oregon, Orechon, Tutapi) (dialect: Nebaji)
Retuarã (Letuama, Tanimuca-Retuarã)
Yahuna (Jaúna, Yauna)
Tama †
Eastern Tukanoan
Cubeo (Kubeo, Pamié, Cuveo, Cubeu, Kobeua, Kobewa, Kubwa, Kobéwa, Hehenawa, Pamiwa)
Miriti † (Miriti-Tapuyo, Neenoá)
Macuna (Makuna, Buhagana, Baigana, Wuhána, Jepa-Matsi, Yepá-Mahsá, Yehpá Majsá, Yepá Maxsã, Yebamasã, Paneroa, Wahana, Makuna-Erulia)
Yupuá-Duriña † (Yupua, Sokó, Uri, Duriña)
Kueretú † (Cueretú, Coretú, Curetú)
Desano-Siriano
Bará-Tuyuka (Barasano, Tuyuca)
Carapano (Karapaná, Karapano, Carapana-Tapuya, Tatuyo, Mochda, Moxdoa, Mextã)
Tucano (Tukano, Dasea, Daxsea) (dialects: Yohoraa (Curaua), Wasona (Uasona))
Wanano-Piratapuyo (Guanano, Wanâna, Uanana, Anana, Kótedia, Kótirya, Kotiria; Wanana, Waikena, Waikina, Uiquina, Waikino, Pira-Tapuya, Uaikena, Uaicana, Waikhara, Waina, Uaiana, Uainana, Urubu-Tapuya)
Arapaso † (Arapaço, Arapasso, Koneá)

Tupían
Western Tupían
Arikém subfamily
Arikém (Ariquême)
Kabixiána
Karitiána (Caritiana)
Mondéan subfamily
Paitér (Suruí, Suruí do Jiparaná, Suruí de Rondônia, Surui Paiter)
Cinta-larga
Gavião (Digüt, Ikõrõ, Gavião do Jiparaná)
Zoró
Mondé (Sanamaikã (Sanamaicá), Salamãi)
Aruá (Aruaxi, Aruashí)
Puruborá (Boruborá, Puruba, Aurã, Pumbora, Puroborá, Burubora, Kuyubi, Cujubi, Migueleno, Miguelenho)
Ramaráman subfamily
Káro (Arara, Urukú)
Ramaráma (Itogapúk, Ntogapíd)
Urumí
Tuparían subfamily
Tuparí
Kepkiriwát (Quepiquiriuate, Kepikiriwat, Kepkeriwát)
Makuráp (Macurap, Macurape)
Mekéns (Mekém, Sakurabiat, Sakyrabiat)
Akuntsú (Akunsú)
Waratégaya (Amiapé)
Wayoró (Ayurú, Wayru, Wayurú, Ayurú, Ajurú, Uaiora, Wajaru)
Mekens
Eastern Tupían
Awetí (Auetö, Awetö, Aueto, Aueti, Auiti, Arauite, Arauine)
Jurúnan subfamily
Jurúna (Yuruna, Yudjá, Djudjá, Jaruna)
Manitsawá (Maritsauá, Manitzula) (dialect: Arupai (Urupaya))
Xipáya (Shipaya, Shipaja, Xipaia)
Mawé (Maué, Sataré, Sateré, Sateré-Mawé)
Mundurukún subfamily
Kuruáya (Caravare, Curuaia, Kuruaia)
Mundurukú (Mundurucu, Monjoroku, Weidyenye, Paiquize, Pari, Caras-Pretas)
Tupí-Guaranían subfamily
Guaranían branch
Guaraní Antigo (Guaraní, old Guaraní)
Paraguayan Guaraní (Guaraní, Guarani paraguaio, Avañee)
Kaiwá (Kayowá, Kaiowá, Caiová, Caiguá, Pãi, Pãi-Tavyterã)
Nhandéva (Ñandeva, Chiripá)
Xetá (Shetá, Aré, Notobotocudo)
Chiriguano group (Ava, Simba, Chané, Izoceño (Isosó, Izozó), Tapiete)
Argentina, Bolívia, Paraguay (Dietrich 2007)
Guayakí (Guayaquí, Aché, Axe)
Guaráyoan branch
Guarayo (Guarayú)
Sirionó
Yúki (Yuqui)
Tupi branch of Tupí-Guaranían
Língua Geral Amazônica (Língua Geral, Nheengatú, Tapïhïya, Tupi moderno)
Língua Geral Paulista (Língua Geral, Tupí)
Tupí (Tupi antigo)
Tupinambá (Língua brasílica, Tupi antigo)
Teneteháran branch
Avá (Canoeiro, Avá-Canoeiro)
Tapirapé
Parakanã (Paracanã, Apiteréwa)
Tocantins Asuriní (Assurini, Asuriní do Tocantins, Asuriní do Trocará, Akwáwa)
Suruí (Suruí do Tocantins, Aikewara, Mudjetíre)
Tembé (Tenetehára)
Guajajára (Tenetehára)
Turiwára (Turiuara)
Xingu branch
Araweté
Amanajé (Amanage, Amanayé, Amanyé, Manajo, Manaxo, Manaze, Manazo)
Ararandewára
Aurê (Aurá)
Anambé of Cairarí
Xingu Asuriní (Assurini, Asuriní do Xingu, Asuriní do Coatinema, Awaeté)
Kawahíb branch
Amondáwa (Amundáwa)
Uruewawáu (Uru-eu-wau-wau, Uru-eu-uau-uau)
Karipúna
Piripkúra
Diahói (Diahui, Jahoi, Jahui, Diarrui)
Parintintín (Parintintim, Kagwahív)
Tenharín (Tenharim)
Tupí-Kawahíb (Tupi do Machado, Paranawát, Pawaté, Wiraféd)
Apiaká (Apiacá)
Júma (Yuma)
Kayabí (Caiabi)
Kamayurá (Kamaiurá, Camaiurá)
Northern Tupí-Guaranían branch
Anambé of Ehrenreich
Guajá (Awá, Avá, Awá Guajá, Ayaya, Guaxare, Wazaizara)
Ka'apór (Urubú, Urubú-Ka'apór, Kaapor)
Takunyapé (Taconhapé)
Wayampí (Oyampi, Wajãpi, Waiãpi)
Wayampipukú
Emérillon (Emerenhão, Emereñon, Emerilon, Melejo, Mereo, Mereyo, Teco)
Zo'é (Zoé, Jo'é)

Tuxá † (Tushá, Todela)

Urarina (Simacu, Kachá, Itucale, Urariña, Oruarina)

Wamoé † (Uamué, Huamoi, Umán, Uame, Huamoé, Araticum, Atikum, Aticum)

Warao (Guarao, Warau, Warrau, Guaruno, Waraw, Araote, Faraute)

Witotoan (Huitotoan)
Ocaina (dialects: Dukaiya, Ibo'tsa)
Early Huitoto
Nipode (Huitoto Muinane, Nïpode, Nüpode Huitoto)
Minica-Murai
Mɨnɨca (Huitoto Meneca)
Murui (Huitoto Murui, Murai, Búe)

Xukurú † (Xucuru, Ichikile, Shukurú)

Yagan (Yahgan, Yaghan, Yamana, Yámana, Tequenica, Yapoo)

Yaguan (Peban, Peba-Yaguan family)
Yagua (Yihamwo, Nijyamïï, Nikyejaada, Yahua, Llagua, Yava, Yegua, Mishara)
Peba † (Nijamvo)
Yameo † (Llameo, Camuchivo, Masamae, Mazan, Parara)

Yanomaman (Yanomamian)
Ninam (Yanam, Xirianá, Shiriana Casapare, Jawaperi, Crichana, Jawari)
Sanumá (Sanimá, Sanma, Tsanuma, Guaika, Samatari, Samatali, Xamatari) (dialects: Ninam (Shirishana, Mukajai), Northern Ninam (Shiriana, Uraricaa-Paragua), Caura, Ervato-Ventuari, Auaris; Yanoma, Cobari (Kobali, Cobariwa))
Yanomam (Waiká (Waicá), Yanomami, Yanomamé, Surara, Xurima, Parahuri, Yanoam)
(dialects: Yanamam (Patimitheri, Waika), Yanomam (Naomam, Guadema, Wadema, Warema), Yanomay (Toototobi), Nanomam (Karime), Jauari (Joari, Yoari, Aica))
Yanomamö (Yanomamï, Yamomame, Guaicá, Guaharibo, Guajaribo, Yanomami, Shamatri, Shaathari, Cobari Kobali, Cobariwa)
(dialects: Eastern Yanomami (Parima), Western Yanomami (Padamo-Orinoco))

Yaruro (Pumé, Llaruro, Yaruru, Yuapín)

Yaté (Fulnio, Furniô, Fórnio, Carnijó, Iaté, Yathé)

Yuracaré (Yuracare, Yurucar, Yuracar, Yurujure, Cuchi, Enete)

Yurumanguí † (Yurimanguí)

Zamucoan
Ayoreo (Ayoré, Moro, Zamuco, Pyeta, Yovai)
(dialect: Tsiricua, Tsiracua)
Chamacoco (Ishiro, Jeywo)
(dialects: Chamacoco Bravo (Tomaraho, Tomaraxa, Tumarahá), Ebitoso (Ebidoso, Ishiro))

Zaparoan
Andoa † (Shimigae)
Arabela
Cahuarano †
Iquito
Záparo (Kayapi)
Gae †
Coronado †
Oa †

See also
Lenguas indígenas de América (Spanish Wikipedia appendix)
Languages of South America
Indigenous languages of South America
Amazonian languages
List of indigenous languages of Argentina
List of unclassified languages of South America
List of extinct languages of South America
Extinct languages of the Marañón River basin
Indigenous languages of the Americas
Classification of indigenous languages of the Americas

References

South America
Languages of South America
Indigenous languages of South America